Caputanurininae is a subfamily of springtails in the family Neanuridae. There are at least two genera and at least one described species, Caputanurina sinensis, in Caputanurininae.

Genera
These two genera belong to the subfamily Caputanurininae:
 Caputanurina Lee, 1983
 Leenurina Najt & Weiner, 1992

References

Further reading

 

Neanuridae
Arthropod subfamilies